New English School may refer to:

 New English School, Kalwa, Thane, Maharashtra, India.
New English School (Jordan)
 New English School (Kuwait)
 New English School Inamgaon, Pune, India
 New English School, Puntamba, Maharashtra, India.